Epicaste (Ancient Greek: Ἐπικάστη Epikaste) or Epicasta is a name attributed to five women in Greek mythology.

Epicaste, a Calydonian princess as daughter of King Calydon by Aeolia, daughter of Amythaon, and thus, sister of Protogeneia. She married her cousin Agenor, son of King Pleuron, and had by him children: Porthaon, Demonice, and possibly Thestius.
Epicaste, an Elean princess as daughter of King Augeas. She bore Heracles a son, Thestalus.
Epicaste, another name for Jocasta/Iocaste, used by Homer.
Epicaste, wife of Clymenus, son of Teleus of Argos, and mother of Harpalyce, Idas, and Therager.
Epicaste, daughter of Nestor and mother of Homer himself by Telemachus, son of Odysseus.

Notes

References 

 Apollodorus, The Library with an English Translation by Sir James George Frazer, F.B.A., F.R.S. in 2 Volumes, Cambridge, MA, Harvard University Press; London, William Heinemann Ltd. 1921. ISBN 0-674-99135-4. Online version at the Perseus Digital Library. Greek text available from the same website.
 Homer, The Odyssey with an English Translation by A.T. Murray, PH.D. in two volumes. Cambridge, MA., Harvard University Press; London, William Heinemann, Ltd. 1919. . Online version at the Perseus Digital Library. Greek text available from the same website.
 Parthenius, Love Romances translated by Sir Stephen Gaselee (1882-1943), S. Loeb Classical Library Volume 69. Cambridge, MA. Harvard University Press. 1916.  Online version at the Topos Text Project.
 Parthenius, Erotici Scriptores Graeci, Vol. 1. Rudolf Hercher. in aedibus B. G. Teubneri. Leipzig. 1858. Greek text available at the Perseus Digital Library.

Princesses in Greek mythology
Women of Heracles
Aetolian characters in Greek mythology
Elean characters in Greek mythology
Pylian characters in Greek mythology
Children of Nestor (mythology)